Willette Kershaw (June 17, 1882 – May 4, 1960) was an American Broadway stage actress and later silent film actress. Her younger sister was actress Elinor Kershaw who later married Thomas Ince.

The daughter of Harry Kershaw, she was born in St. Louis and graduated from Central High School and the Lindley School of Dramatic Art.

Kershaw's Broadway credits include Yes or No (1917), The Unchastened Woman (1915), A Pair of White Gloves (1913), The Switchboard (1913), Snobs (1911), The Country Boy (1910), The Heights (1910), and Robert Burns (1905).

Kershaw married actor Arthur Morrison, and the marriage ended in 1909. In 1923, Kershaw married David Sturgis in New Rochelle, New York.

Filmography
Men (1918)
Cecilia of the Pink Roses (1918)
The Sporting Life (1918)
The Vortex (1928)

References

External links

Willette Kershaw portrait NY Public Library
Willete Kershaw image from the one-act play Any Night, which also starred Harrison Ford
Willette Kershaw pose in the 1920s National Portrait Gallery UK
portrait gallery (Univ of Washington, Sayre collection)

1882 births
1960 deaths
American stage actresses
American silent film actresses
Actresses from St. Louis
20th-century American actresses